The M93 is a short metropolitan route in the Greater Johannesburg, South Africa. It consists of only one street (Refinery Road) in the city of Germiston.

Route 
The M93 begins at the M2 and ends at the M37.

References 

Streets and roads of Johannesburg
Metropolitan routes in Johannesburg